Madam Secretary is an American political drama television series created by Barbara Hall. It stars Téa Leoni as Elizabeth "Bess" Adams McCord, an ex-CIA analyst who becomes the United States Secretary of State. Madam Secretary was ordered to series in May 2014, and premiered on September 21, 2014, on CBS.

Madam Secretary was renewed for a sixth and final season in May 2019, which premiered on October 6, 2019.

Series overview

Episodes

Season 1 (2014–15)

Season 2 (2015–16)

Season 3 (2016–17)

Season 4 (2017–18)

Season 5 (2018–19)

Season 6 (2019)

Ratings

Season 6

References

External links
 
 

Madam Secretary
Episodes